Harnden Farm, known today as Infinity Farm, is a historic farmstead in Andover, Massachusetts.  It includes a farmhouse and barn, built c. 1840 for Jesse Harnden, a farmer who moved from Reading.  The house is notable for its late Federal style elements as well as its Greek Revival styling.  It is  stories high, five bays wide, with a side gable roof and end chimneys.  Its main entrance is sheltered by a portico with fluted columns and a balustrade on its roof.  The barn on the property is a rare surviving example of a Greek Revival barn.

The farmstead was listed on the National Register of Historic Places in 1982.

See also
National Register of Historic Places listings in Andover, Massachusetts
National Register of Historic Places listings in Essex County, Massachusetts

References

Farms on the National Register of Historic Places in Massachusetts
Buildings and structures in Andover, Massachusetts
National Register of Historic Places in Andover, Massachusetts